The women's 100 metres event at the 2008 World Junior Championships in Athletics was held in Bydgoszcz, Poland, at Zawisza Stadium on 8 and 9 July.

Medalists

Results

Final
9 July
Wind: -0.6 m/s

Semifinals
8 July

Semifinal 1
Wind: 0.0 m/s

Semifinal 2
Wind: -0.7 m/s

Semifinal 3
Wind: -0.5 m/s

Heats
8 July

Heat 1
Wind: -1.9 m/s

Heat 2
Wind: -0.1 m/s

Heat 3
Wind: -1.9 m/s

Heat 4
Wind: -3.3 m/s

Heat 5
Wind: -0.8 m/s

Heat 6
Wind: -1.2 m/s

Heat 7
Wind: -1.6 m/s

Heat 8
Wind: -1.9 m/s

Participation
According to an unofficial count, 65 athletes from 45 countries participated in the event.

References

100 metres
100 metres at the World Athletics U20 Championships
2008 in women's athletics